The Cupra Terramar is an upcoming compact crossover SUV planned for production in 2024 by Spanish Cupra performance-oriented brand. It will come in mild-hybrid- and plug-in-hybrid versions. The Terramar will allegedly replace the Cupra Ateca. It will be the last Cupra launched with a combustion engine offering, as the brand looks to going all-electric in 2030. The car uses an updated version of the MQB platform which underpins Cupra's ICE-powered cars.

The model is named for a Spanish coastal town near Barcelona. It will be built alongside the closely related next-generation Audi Q3.

References 

Terramar
2020s cars
Compact sport utility vehicles
Crossover sport utility vehicles
Upcoming car models
Cars of Spain